Stoney Demonstration Forest is a state forest located in Aberdeen, Maryland, United States.

The forest serves as an educational resource, the main objective of which is to teach silviculture, forest management, and wildlife habitat management practices to students and landowners. The forest occupies  of the rural Harford county. It was originally owned by Sydney Peverly up until 1981 when the state of Maryland purchased the land.

External links
 Maryland DNR - Stoney Demonstration Forest

Maryland state forests
Protected areas of Harford County, Maryland
Aberdeen, Maryland